Mount Paulus is a mountain, 2,420 m, close south of Mount Rossel in the southwest part of the Belgica Mountains. Discovered by a Belgian Antarctic expedition, 1957–58, under G. de Gerlache, who named it for Jean-Pierre Paulus, a patron of the expedition.

Mountains of Queen Maud Land
Princess Ragnhild Coast